This article describes the history of South African cricket from the aftermath of the First World War in 1919 to the end of the Second World War in 1945.

Domestic cricket from 1919 to 1945
Domestic first-class matches focused on the Currie Cup competition which, although it was the national championship, was not always contested because of travel constraints and other reasons. The Currie Cup was not held in seasons when there was a Test tour of South Africa, though it was held in 1931–32 when the South African Test side traveled to Australia and New Zealand.

Until 1926 all cricket in South Africa was played on matting pitches. The first Currie Cup match to be played on a turf pitch was held at the Kingsmead ground in Durban in December 1926, between Natal and Border. The first Test matches on turf pitches were held during the English tour of 1930–31. By the end of the 1930s, all first-class matches in South Africa were played on turf pitches.

Currie Cup winners from 1919–20 to 1944–45

 Not contested: 1919–20, 1922–23, 1924–25, 1927–28, 1928–29, 1930–31, 1932–33, 1935–36, 1938–39, 1939–40, 1940–41, 1941–42, 1942–43, 1943–44, 1944–45.
 1920–21: Western Province
 1921–22: undecided
 1923–24: Transvaal
 1925–26: Transvaal
 1926–27: Transvaal
 1929–30: Transvaal
 1931–32: Western Province
 1933–34: Natal
 1934–35: Transvaal
 1936–37: Natal
 1937–38: Natal and Transvaal (shared)

Second World War
From the outset of the war, South Africa was actively involved as a member of the Allies.  The war brought austerity and cricket was considered by many to be frivolous in such circumstances.  Only one first-class game was played in South Africa during the wartime seasons.

This match took place during the 1942 New Year period at Newlands in Cape Town between Western Province and Transvaal.  It ended in a draw.  Western Province batted first and scored 237 in 79.1 overs. In reply, James Pickerill's 71 was the top score, and Reginald Lofthouse's 4–63 was the best return as Transvaal made 251 for 8 declared. Sidney Kiel top-scored in the match with 128 not out as Western Province declared on 236 for 8. This didn't quite leave enough time for a result and Transvaal had made 166–6 when stumps were drawn.

International tours of South Africa from 1919–20 to 1944–45

Australian Imperial Forces (AIF) 1919–20

 Western Province v AIF – AIF won by 2 wickets
 Transvaal v AIF – match drawn
 Natal v AIF – AIF won by 310 runs
 Natal v AIF – AIF won by an innings and 42 runs
 Transvaal v AIF – AIF won by an innings and 14 runs
 South Africa v AIF – AIF won by 8 wickets
 South Africa v AIF – AIF won by an innings and 129 runs
 Western Province v AIF – match drawn

The AIF team had players of the caliber of Jack Gregory, Herbie Collins, Bert Oldfield, and Nip Pellew.

Australia 1921–22

 1st Test at Lord's, Durban – match drawn
 2nd Test at Old Wanderers, Johannesburg – match drawn
 3rd Test at Newlands Cricket Ground, Cape Town – Australia won by 10 wickets

England 1922–23

 1st Test at Old Wanderers, Johannesburg – South Africa won by 168 runs
 2nd Test at Newlands Cricket Ground, Cape Town – England won by 1 wicket
 3rd Test at Kingsmead, Durban – match drawn
 4th Test at Old Wanderers, Johannesburg – match drawn
 5th Test at Kingsmead, Durban – England won by 109 runs

England 1924–25

A team captained by Lionel Tennyson and including 12 past or future England Test players toured South Africa between November 1924 and February 1925.

England 1927–28

 1st Test at Old Wanderers, Johannesburg – England won by 10 wickets
 2nd Test at Newlands Cricket Ground, Cape Town – England won by 87 runs
 3rd Test at Kingsmead, Durban – match drawn
 4th Test at Old Wanderers, Johannesburg – South Africa won by 4 wickets
 5th Test at Kingsmead, Durban – South Africa won by 8 wickets

England 1930–31

 1st Test at Old Wanderers, Johannesburg – South Africa won by 28 runs
 2nd Test at Newlands Cricket Ground, Cape Town – match drawn
 3rd Test at Kingsmead, Durban – match drawn
 4th Test at Old Wanderers, Johannesburg – match drawn
 5th Test at Kingsmead, Durban – match drawn

Australia 1935–36

 1st Test at Kingsmead, Durban – Australia won by 9 wickets
 2nd Test at Old Wanderers, Johannesburg – match drawn
 3rd Test at Newlands Cricket Ground, Cape Town – Australia won by an innings and 78 runs
 4th Test at Old Wanderers, Johannesburg – Australia won by an innings and 184 runs
 5th Test at Kingsmead, Durban – Australia won by an innings and 6 runs

England 1938–39

 1st Test at Old Wanderers, Johannesburg – match drawn
 2nd Test at Newlands Cricket Ground, Cape Town – match drawn
 3rd Test at Kingsmead, Durban – England won by an innings and 13 runs
 4th Test at Old Wanderers, Johannesburg – match drawn
 5th Test at Kingsmead, Durban – match drawn

References

Further reading
 H S Altham and EW Swanton, A History of Cricket, Volume 2 (to 1945), George Allen & Unwin, 1947
 Rowland Bowen, Cricket: A History of its Growth and Development, Eyre & Spottiswoode, 1970
 Louis Duffus, South African Cricket, Volume 3, 1927–1947, The South African Cricket Association, 1948
 South African Cricket Annual – various editions
 various writers, A Century of South Africa in Test & International Cricket 1889–1989, Ball, 1989

External links
 CricketArchive – itinerary of South African cricket

1921 in South African cricket
1922 in South African cricket
1927 in South African cricket
1928 in South African cricket
1930 in South African cricket
1931 in South African cricket
1935 in South African cricket
1936 in South African cricket
1938 in South African cricket
1939 in South African cricket
1945
1945
1945